Scampston Hall is a Grade II* listed country house in North Yorkshire, England, with a serpentine park designed by Charles Bridgeman and Capability Brown. It is located on the north side of the A64 Leeds/Scarborough road, 4 miles (6 km) east of Malton, in Scampston village. The name of the village was referred to in various ways in ancient documents as: Scamestun, Skameston, Skameston, and Skampston, and was probably derived from a personal name.

The hall features in two storeys of stuccoed orange-red brick with a slate roof and stuccoed brick chimney stacks. The frontage has seven bays, the central three of which are bowed.

History
Scampston Hall was built in the late 1600s for William Hustler.

The estate was bought in the 1690s by Sir William St Quintin, 3rd Baronet, who was Receiver General for Ireland and Member of Parliament for Hull. The estate and title were inherited in 1723 by his nephew -- also William -- who was MP for Thirsk. He married wealthy heiress Rececca Thompson.  With her money he was able to expand the estate and employ Capability Brown to landscape the park. The serpentine park of about 1.7 square kilometres was laid out first by Charles Bridgeman and later by Lancelot "Capability" Brown in 1772. It includes an unusual ionic "Bridge Building," concealing the end of a sheet of water and closing the view. 

The baronetcy expired on the death of the last Sir William, the 5th Baronet, without issue in 1795. He was succeeded by his nephew, William Thomas Darby Esq., the son of Vice-Admiral George Darby, who assumed the surname and arms of St. Quintin in 1795. Between 1795 and 1801 William Thomas commissioned the architect Thomas Leverton to extensively remodel the hall in the Regency style, with fine Regency interiors. On his early death in 1805 it passed to his 7-year-old son William (1798-1859). William lived mainly in London but returned to Scampston when he was appointed High Sheriff of Yorkshire in 1850. He died childless in 1859 and was succeeded by his brother, Matthew Chitty Downes St. Quintin, a JP and colonel of the 17th Lancers. Matthew became mentally ill and spent much of what remained of the family fortune, dying in 1876. His son William Herbert St. Quintin, born in 1851, was a Justice of the Peace from 1875 to his death and an alderman from 1889. He was appointed High Sheriff of Yorkshire for 1899–1900 and Deputy Lieutenant of the East Riding. He was also a keen naturalist. On his death in 1933 the St. Quintin name died out and the estate passed into the hands of the Lestrange Malone family, as his daughter Margery had married Lt. Col. Edmund George S. L'Estrange Malone in 1910.

In 1959 Scampston passed to the Legard (or Le Gard) family (see Legard Baronets) as Colonel Malone's daughter Mary had married Sir Thomas Legard, 14th Baronet in 1935. The estate is now owned by their grandson Christopher, who was High Sheriff of North Yorkshire in 2018/19.

The park contained a large deer herd until World War II. Arthur F. Moody's Water-Fowl and Game-Birds in Captivity; Some Notes on Habits & Management (H. F. & G. Witherby, 326 High Holborn, London, W. C.) relates in detail the experience of the bird-keeper for Scampston's grounds in the years of William Herbert St. Quintin.

Scampston's refurbished Walled Garden, designed by Piet Oudolf, opened in 2004.

In October 2021, the building was one of 142 sites across England to receive part of a £35-million injection from the government's Culture Recovery Fund.

A BBC adaptation of An Inspector Calls by J.B. Priestley was filmed on location at Scampston Hall, and broadcast in September 2015.

The house is open by guided tour.

References

External links

The Walled Garden at Scampston - official site
Scampston Hall Garden - information on garden history

Country houses in North Yorkshire
Gardens in North Yorkshire
Historic house museums in North Yorkshire
Grade II* listed buildings in North Yorkshire
Gardens by Capability Brown